Oecomys concolor, also known as the unicolored oecomys, unicolored rice rat, or unicolored arboreal rice rat, is a species of rodent in the genus Oecomys of family Cricetidae. It is found in tropical rainforest in the Amazon biome, but its range is poorly documented; it has been recorded in northwestern Brazil, southeastern Colombia, and southern Venezuela.

References

Literature cited
Carleton,  M.D., Emmons, L.H. and Musser, G.G. 2009. A new species of the rodent genus Oecomys (Cricetidae: Sigmodontinae:  Oryzomyini) from eastern Bolivia, with emended definitions of O. concolor (Wagner) and O. mamorae (Thomas). American Museum Novitates 3661:1–32.
Costa, L., Percequillo, A., Weksler, M., Langguth, A., Patton, J. and Catzeflis, F. 2008. . In IUCN. IUCN Red List of Threatened Species. Version 2009.2. <www.iucnredlist.org>. Downloaded on November 30, 2009.
Musser, G.G. and Carleton, M.D. 2005. Superfamily Muroidea. Pp. 894–1531 in Wilson, D.E. and Reeder, D.M. (eds.). Mammal Species of the World: a taxonomic and geographic reference. 3rd ed. Baltimore: The Johns Hopkins University Press, 2 vols., 2142 pp. 

Oecomys
Mammals of Colombia
Fauna of the Amazon
Mammals described in 1845
Taxa named by Johann Andreas Wagner